The men's 10,000 metres event at the 1970 British Commonwealth Games was held on 20 July at the Meadowbank Stadium in Edinburgh, Scotland. It was the first time that the metric distance was contested at the Games replacing the 6 miles.

Results

References

Athletics at the 1970 British Commonwealth Games
1970